Kemal Kılıçdaroğlu (Turkish: , also referred by his initials KK, born 17 December 1948) is a Turkish economist, retired civil servant and social democratic politician. He is the leader of the Republican People's Party (CHP) and has been Leader of the Main Opposition in Turkey since 2010. He served as a Member of Parliament for İstanbul's second electoral district from 2002 to 2015 and as an MP for İzmir's second electoral district as of 7 June 2015.

Before entering politics, Kılıçdaroğlu was a civil servant and served as the President of the Social Insurance Institution (SSK) from 1992 to 1996 and again from 1997 to 1999. He was elected to Parliament in the 2002 general election and became the CHP's parliamentary group leader. In the 2009 local elections, he was nominated as CHP's candidate for the Mayor of İstanbul, but lost against the AKP.  He was elected deputy chairman of the Socialist International on 31 August 2012.

After Deniz Baykal resigned as the party's leader in 2010, Kılıçdaroğlu announced his candidacy and was unanimously elected as the leader of the CHP. He was seen as likely to breathe new life into the CHP. Although the CHP saw a subsequent increase in its share of the vote, it was unable to unseat the ruling AKP as of 2023. As leader of the main opposition, Kılıçdaroğlu's strategy has been to construct big-tent coalitions with other parties, which culminated in the formation of the Nation Alliance and CHP's subsequent victories in the 2019 local elections. He is the CHP's presidential candidate for the 2023 Turkish presidential election.

Early life 
Kemal Karabulut was born on 17 December 1948 in the Ballıca village of Nazımiye district in Tunceli Province, eastern Turkey to Kamer, a clerk-recorder of deeds and his wife Yemuş. He was the fourth of seven children. His father was among thousands of exiled Alevis following the failed Dersim rebellion. 

Kemal continued his primary and secondary education in various places such as Erciş, Tunceli, Genç, and Elazığ. He was educated in economics at the Ankara Academy of Economics and Commercial Sciences (now Gazi University), from which he graduated in 1971. During his youth, he earned his living by selling goods.

Professional career 
After university, Kemal Kılıçdaroğlu entered the Ministry of Finance as a junior account specialist in 1971. He was later promoted to accountant and was sent to France for additional professional training. In 1983, he was appointed deputy director general of the Revenues Department in the same ministry. At that time he worked closely with Prime Minister Turgut Özal. In 1991, Kılıçdaroğlu became director-general of the Social Security Organization for Artisans and Self-Employed (Bağ-Kur). The following year he was appointed director-general of the Social Insurance Institution (Turkish: , abbreviated SSK).

In 1994, Kılıçdaroğlu was named "Civil Servant of the Year" by the weekly periodical Ekonomik Trend.

Kemal Kılıçdaroğlu retired from the Social Insurance Institution in January 1999. Kılıçdaroğlu taught at Hacettepe University and chaired the Specialized Commission on the Informal Economy within the framework of the preparation of the Eighth Five-Year Development Plan. He also acted as a member of the Executive Board of İşbank.

Early political career

Member of Parliament

He retired from bureaucracy in 1999 and tried to enter politics from within Bülent Ecevit's Democratic Left Party (DSP). Kılıçdaroğlu was often referred to as the "star of the DSP". It was claimed that he would be a DSP candidate in the upcoming 1999 general election (in which the DSP came first). However, he did not succeed in this venture as he could not get on the party's candidates' list. Instead, during his chairmanship of an association that aimed to protect citizens' tax payments, he was invited by the leader of the CHP Deniz Baykal to join his party. Kılıçdaroğlu accepted the invitation.

Following the 2002 general election, he entered the parliament as a deputy from Istanbul. In the 2007 general election, he was re-elected to parliament. He became deputy speaker of his party's parliamentary group.

Kılıçdaroğlu's efforts to uncover malpractice among high-ranking Justice and Development Party (AKP) politicians carried him to headlines in the Turkish media. Two deputy chairmen of the ruling AKP, Şaban Dişli and Dengir Mir Mehmet Fırat, resigned from their respective positions in the party following television debates with Kılıçdaroğlu. Furthermore, he publicly accused the AKP-affiliated Mayor of Ankara, Melih Gökçek, of complicity in a corruption scandal relating to the "Deniz Feneri" charity based in Germany.

2009 İstanbul mayoral candidate

Kılıçdaroğlu was announced as the CHP's mayoral candidate for the 2009 local elections by the party leader Deniz Baykal on 22 January 2009. Kılıçdaroğlu announced that he would run his campaign based on clean politics, vowing to open cases of corruption against the serving incumbent, AKP mayor Kadir Topbaş. Claiming that he would work for the workers of İstanbul, he also challenged Topbaş to a televised live debate.

Kılıçdaroğlu lost the election with 37% of the votes against Topbaş's 44.7%.

Election to the CHP leadership 

Long-time leader of the CHP, Deniz Baykal, resigned on 10 May 2010 following a video tape scandal. Kılıçdaroğlu announced his candidacy for the position on 17 May, five days before an upcoming party convention. According to reports, the party was divided over the leadership issue, with its Central Executive Board insisting that Baykal retake the position. But after Kılıçdaroğlu received the support of 77 of his party's 81 provincial chairpersons, Baykal decided not to run for re-election.

For a candidacy to become official, CHP by-laws require the support of 20% of convention delegates. At the party convention, which started on 22 May 2010, Kılıçdaroğlu's candidacy received the signatures of 1,246 out of the 1,250 delegates, which set a new record for the CHP.

In view of this overwhelming support, the presidium of the party convention decided to move the election, initially scheduled for Sunday, forward to Saturday. As now expected, Kılıçdaroğlu was elected as party chairman. The election was unanimous, with 1,189 votes (not counting eight votes that were found to be invalid).

Leader of the Opposition
Kılıçdaroğlu took office as the Leader of the Main Opposition on 22 May 2010 by virtue of leading the second largest political party in the Grand National Assembly. Many media commentators and speculators predicted that Kılıçdaroğlu would breathe new life into the CHP after consecutive election defeats under Baykal's leadership.

2010 constitutional referendum

Kılıçdaroğlu's first campaign as the CHP leader was the constitutional referendum held on 12 September 2010. Although the initial voting process in Parliament (that would determine the proposals that were voted on in the subsequent referendum) had begun under Baykal's leadership, Kılıçdaroğlu employed a tactic of boycotting the parliamentary process. Since a constitutional reform proposal required 330 votes to be sent to a referendum (the governing AKP, which had submitted the proposals, held 336 seats), the parliamentary approval of all of the government's constitutional reforms was mathematically possible regardless of how the CHP voted. Thus, the AKP's proposed constitutional reforms, which included changes to the Turkish Judiciary, were sent for approval in a referendum on 12 September 2010.

Kılıçdaroğlu not only campaigned for a 'no' vote against the proposals, but also sent the Parliamentary voting process to court over alleged technical irregularities. The CHP subsequently sent the proposals to court over alleged violations of the separation of powers in the proposed changes. the Constitutional Court eventually ruled against the CHP. Kılıçdaroğlu, along with members of minor opposition parties, argued that the proposed changes are an attempt to politicise the judiciary and further increase the control of the AKP over neutral state institutions. The referendum proposals were nonetheless accepted by 57.9% of voters, with 42.1% voting against.

2011 general election

The 2011 general election was the first general election in which Kemal Kılıçdaroğlu participated as the leader of Republican People's Party (CHP). The former CHP leader Deniz Baykal resigned from his post in May 2010 and left the CHP with 26% of the votes, according to opinion polls. Kılıçdaroğlu announced that he would resign from his post if he was not successful in the 2011 elections. He did not provide details as to what his criteria for success were. Over 3,500 people applied to run for the main opposition party in the June elections. Male candidates paid 3,000 Turkish Liras to submit an application; female candidates paid 2,000 while those with disabilities paid 500 liras. Among the candidates were former CHP leader Deniz Baykal and arrested Ergenekon suspects such as Mustafa Balbay and Mehmet Haberal.

The party held primary elections in 29 provinces. Making a clean break with the past, Kemal Kılıçdaroğlu left his mark on the Republican People's Party's 435-candidate list, leaving off 78 current deputies as he sought to redefine and reposition the main opposition. The CHP's candidate list also included 11 politicians who were formerly part of center-right parties, such as the Motherland Party, the True Path Party and the Turkey Party. Center-right voters gravitated toward the AKP when these other parties virtually collapsed after the 2002 elections. Key party figures that did not make it on to the list, criticised the CHP for making "a shift in axis." His statement on the election results "CHP is the only party that increased the number of deputies in the election. In a short period of 6 months, CHP gained 3.5 million new voters. So we will not demoralise ourselves," he said.

2015 general elections

The June 2015 general election was the second general election which Kemal Kılıçdaroğlu participated as the leader of CHP. The party won 11.5 million votes (24.95%) and finished with 132 elected Members of Parliament, a decrease of 3 since the 2011 general election. The decrease of 1.03% compared to their 2011 result (25.98%) was attributed to CHP voters voting tactically for the Peoples' Democratic Party (HDP) to ensure that they surpassed the 10% election threshold. While the result demonstrated a stagnant CHP vote, HDP's entry into parliament resulted in AKP losing its parliamentary majority. Coalition talks between AKP and CHP proved fruitless, a snap election was called for November, in which AKP regained its majority. No opinion poll (apart from one dubious poll released in March 2014) showed the CHP ahead of the AKP between 2011 and 2015.

Constitutional referendum
After the 2017 Turkish constitutional referendum, which significantly expanded President Erdoğan's powers, Kılıçdaroğlu and CHP filed a court appeal against a decision by Turkey's Supreme Electoral Council (YSK) to accept unstampted ballots. Kemal Kılıçdaroğlu has said that the YSK decision may be appealed to the ECHR, but members of the AKP government have said that neither ECHR nor Turkey's Constitutional Court have any jurisdiction over the YSK decision. Kılıçdaroğlu said: "In 2014 [the Constitutional Court] said ‘Elections are canceled if there is no seal on ballot papers or envelopes.’[ ... ]The YSK can't express an opinion above the will of the parliament,[ ... ]If the Constitutional Court rejects our application, we will regard the changes as illegitimate. There is also the ECHR. If necessary, we will take the case there.”

March for Justice 

On 15 June 2017, Kılıçdaroğlu started the 450 km March for Justice from Ankara to Istanbul in protest of the arrest of Enis Berberoğlu following the 2016 coup d'état attempt. Initially only joined by a few hundred protesters, the march grew to the thousands. On 9 July 2017, a final rally was held in Istanbul with hundreds of thousands of people.

2018 Elections 

In the 2018 elections, Kılıçdaroğlu as leader of the CHP and İyi Parti leader Meral Akşener established Nation Alliance (Millet İtifakı) as an electoral alliance in response to the AKP and MHP's People's Alliance (Cumhur İtifakı). Nation Alliance was soon joined by the Felicity Party and Democrat Parties.

2019 Municipal Election 

In 2019, Kılıçdaroğlu and Akşener continued their parties' cooperation in the 2019 municipal election, capturing the mayoralties of Istanbul and Ankara from the AKP after a quarter of a century of control by Islamist parties.

2023 Presidential Election 
Kılıçdaroğlu, who has followed a big tent policy for a long time, announced on his social media account and CHP social media accounts on 13 November 2021 that the CHP has made mistakes in the past and has decided to embark on a journey of reconciliation with his "Call for Reconciliation". 

Upon Kılıçdaroğlu's call, on 12 February 2022, 6 opposition party leaders (Good Party Chairman Meral Akşener, Future Party Chairman Ahmet Davutoğlu, DEVA Party Chairman Ali Babacan, Felicity Party Chairman Temel Karamollaoğlu) met in Ahlatlıbel, Ankara to discuss a consensus text on a strengthened parliamentary system and an electoral alliance was officially announced, the alliance was called the "Table of Six".

When the issue of a joint candidate was raised by the Table of Six, Kılıçdaroğlu pointed to the Table of Six on FOX TV's morning show "Çalar Saat" on 5 September 2022 and said, "If there is a consensus on me, I am ready to run for the presidential elections." This was the first time Kılıçdaroğlu openly expressed his will to run for the presidential elections. Ekrem İmamoğlu, the mayor of Istanbul, and Mansur Yavaş the mayor of Ankara announced their support for Kılıçdaroğlu's candidacy. 

On 6 March 2023, he declared his candidacy for the 2023 Turkish presidential election. His candidacy is supported by the Party of European Socialists

Controversies 
In January 2016, he was prosecuted for insulting President Erdoğan for making statements that implied the President is a dictator after Kılıçdaroğlu spoke out against the arrest of over 20 Academics for Peace who signed a petition condemning a military crackdown in the Kurdish-dominated southeast. What Kılıçdaroğlu said was: "Academics who express their opinions have been detained one by one on instructions given by a so-called dictator"

Kılıçdaroğlu criticized the European Court of Human Rights for rejecting a petition from a Turkish teacher who applied to the ECHR claiming that he was wrongly dismissed from his position during the 2016-17 Turkish purges. The ECHR said that plaintiffs should apply to Turkey's State of Emergency Investigation Commission before applying to the Court. Kılıçdaroğlu replied: "Don’t you know what is going on in Turkey? Which commission are you talking about? People are dying in prisons. We waited five months to just appoint members."

In 2017, Kılıçdaroğlu flashed the greywolf sign, used by nationalists. It has been suggested that this is to compete with the MHP and the AKP for right-wing voters.

Kılıçdaroğlu has explicitly supported the deportation of Syrian refugees from Turkey, citing economic strain on citizens and the alleged desire of humans to live in their region of birth.

Personal life
Kemal Kılıçdaroğlu and his wife, Selvi Gündüz, have a son, Kerem, two daughters, Aslı and Zeynep, and a granddaughter from Aslı's marriage.  

Kılıçdaroğlu's family is known as the Cebeligiller and belongs to Kureyşan tribe, Kureyşan is one of the most prominent Zaza tribes. Kılıçdaroğlu married a former journalist, who is also his relative, Selvi Gündüz in 1974. In response to a question asked to him in 2022, Kılıçdaroğlu said that he is a passive speaker of Zaza, adding that he better understood the Zaza spoken in the Bingöl region. He speaks Turkish and intermediate French as well.

In response to the then AK Party deputy chairman Hüseyin Çelik, who opened a discussion regarding his origin, Kılıçdaroğlu made the following statement to Milliyet columnist Fikret Bila:

During the 1950s, his father changed their family name from Karabulut to Kılıçdaroğlu, since all the people in the village they lived in had the same family name.  

Some journalists have denoted his Alevi identity, however Kılıçdaroğlu did not make a statement about his religious beliefs for a long time. In July 2011, he said:

Works 
Kılıçdaroğlu has four published books and many articles:

 İşsizlik Sigortası Kanunu-Yorum ve Açıklamalar, (1993)
 1948 Türkiye İktisat Kongresi, (1997)
 Kayıtdışı Ekonomi ve Bürokraside Yeniden Yapılanma Gereği, (1997)
 Özgür ve Adil Bir Türkiye İçin Yürüyüş, (2020)

Electoral history

Presidential

Parliamentary

Local 

Istanbul

See also 

 Nation Alliance
 Canan Kaftancıoğlu

References

Notes

Citations

Sources

External links 

  
 Kemal Kılıçdaroğlu's biography at TBMM's website 
 
 
 A Long March for Justice in Turkey (Gastbeitrag, www.nytimes.com 7 July 2017)

|-

1948 births
Deputies of Istanbul
Gazi University alumni
Leaders of political parties in Turkey
Leaders of the Opposition (Turkey)
Leaders of the Republican People's Party (Turkey)
Living people
Members of the 22nd Parliament of Turkey
Members of the 23rd Parliament of Turkey
Members of the 24th Parliament of Turkey
Members of the 25th Parliament of Turkey
People from Nazımiye
Turkish Alevis
Turkish civil servants
Turkish economists
Turkish twins
Contemporary Republican People's Party (Turkey) politicians
Members of the 26th Parliament of Turkey
Members of the 27th Parliament of Turkey